Nesian may refer to:

 someone or something related to the ancient city-state of Nesa, in Anatolia (modern Turkey)
 someone or something related to the Nesians (an endonymic term for ancient Hittites)
 Nesian language, a variant (endonymic) term for the ancient Hittite language
 Nesian Mystik, a musical group from New Zealand

See also
 Nesa (disambiguation)
 Nessa (disambiguation)